Leader of the Pack is the 1965 debut album by girl group the Shangri-Las. The album was produced to capitalize on the group's breakthrough hits "Remember (Walking in the Sand)" and "Leader of the Pack" which had been co-written by Jeff Barry and Ellie Greenwich. After the album's focal track went to number one, The Shangri-Las' style and image had evolved into something tougher and earthier.

Much of the material for Leader of the Pack such as "Bull Dog" and "It's Easier to Cry" emphasized their new style. Other songs on the album include cover versions of "Maybe" originally by The Chantels with Betty Weiss on lead vocals, along with "Shout" by The Isley Brothers and "Twist and Shout" by the Top Notes. Also on the album is "Give Him a Great Big Kiss" which The Shangri-Las would release as a single later in the year. Although the group had scored two major hits, the album only charted at 109 on the U.S. albums chart.

The album was rated the 49th best album of the 1960s by Pitchfork.

Track listing  
Side one
"Give Him a Great Big Kiss" (George Morton) – 2:12
"Leader of the Pack" (Morton, Jeff Barry, Ellie Greenwich) – 2:48
"Bull Dog" (Jerry Leiber, Mike Stoller) – 2:22
"It's Easier to Cry" (J. J. Jackson, Joe De Angelis, Robert Steinberg) – 2:35
"What Is Love" (Morton, Tony Michaels) – 2:55
"Remember (Walking in the Sand)" (Morton) – 2:18 

Side two
"Twist and Shout" (Phil Medley, Bert Russell) – 2:39
"Maybe" (Arlene Smith, George Goldner) – 2:40
"So Much in Love" (Billy Jackson, Roy Straigis) – 2:16
"Shout" (Rudolph Isley, Ronald Isley, O'Kelly Isley, Jr.) – 2:10
"Good Night, My Love, Pleasant Dreams" (George Motola, John Marascalco) – 1:15
"You Can't Sit Down" (Cornell Muldrow, Dee Clark) – 2:18

Personnel
Shangri-Las
Mary Weiss – lead and backing vocals
Betty Weiss – lead and backing vocals
Marge Ganser – backing vocals
Mary Ann Ganser – backing vocals
Technical
Shadow Morton – producer
Brooks Arthur – engineer 
Rod McBrien – engineer
Loring Eutemey – artwork
Hugh Bell – cover photography

Singles history
"Remember (Walking in the Sand)" b/w "It's Easier To Cry" (U.S. #5, UK #14) 
"Leader of the Pack" b/w "What Is Love?" (U.S. #1, UK #11 (1965), UK #3 (1972), UK #7 (1976)
"Give Him a Great Big Kiss" b/w "Twist and Shout" (U.S. #18)
"Maybe" b/w "Shout" (U.S. #91)

References 
The Story of The Shangri-Las
The Shangri-Las Albums Guide

Specific

1965 debut albums
The Shangri-Las albums
Albums produced by Shadow Morton
Red Bird Records albums